Ladislav Souček (born 12 May 1946) is a Czechoslovak sprint canoeist who competed in the early to mid-1970s. He won a  silver medal in the K-1 500 m event at the 1971 ICF Canoe Sprint World Championships in Belgrade.

Souček also competed in two Summer Olympics, earning his best finish of fifth in the K-1 1000 m event at Munich in 1972.

References

Sports-reference.com profile

1946 births
Canoeists at the 1972 Summer Olympics
Canoeists at the 1976 Summer Olympics
Czechoslovak male canoeists
Living people
Olympic canoeists of Czechoslovakia
ICF Canoe Sprint World Championships medalists in kayak